Rosa Mary Barrett (1855–1936) was an English-born Irish social reformer, educationalist and suffragist; her brother was the physicist William F. Barrett.

Barrett moved to Monkstown, Co. Dublin and then to Kingstown (now Dún Laoghaire), Co. Dublin, in Ireland. In 1879 she helped set up a committee for the establishment of a care facility for children, effectively a creche allowing women to enter the workforce. It eventually led to the establishment of The Cottage Home for Little Children which housed Protestant children. To avoid accusations of proselytising, the home did not accept Catholic children.
 
Rosa Barrett founded the Irish section of the National Society for the Prevention of Cruelty to Children in 1889. In the 1901 census she lists her religion as a Congregationalist, her grandfather being a Congregationalist minister.

References

1855 births
1936 deaths
British philanthropists
Education activists
Irish suffragists
National Society for the Prevention of Cruelty to Children people
Social reformers